Two vessels of the Royal Navy have been named HMS Ness after the Scottish River Ness:

  was a  launched on 5 January 1905 at J S White in Cowes and sold in 1919.
  was a  launched at Robbs in Leith on 30 July 1942 and sold in 1956, broken up at Newport.

References
 

Royal Navy ship names